Nathanael "Nate" Glubish  (born August 21, 1981) is a Canadian politician who was elected in the 2019 Alberta general election to the Legislative Assembly of Alberta representing the electoral district of Strathcona-Sherwood Park.

References

United Conservative Party MLAs
Living people
1981 births
21st-century Canadian politicians
Members of the Executive Council of Alberta
University of Saskatchewan alumni